Dara Bashir is a Pakistani former cricketer. He played thirteen first-class cricket matches for several domestic sides in Pakistan between 1977 and 1984.

See also
 List of Pakistan Automobiles Corporation cricketers

References

External links
 

Year of birth missing (living people)
Living people
Pakistani cricketers
Karachi Blues cricketers
Pakistan Automobiles Corporation cricketers
Pakistan International Airlines cricketers
Place of birth missing (living people)